Allah Dino Khawaja ( A.D. Khawaja) is a Pakistani police officer who serves in BPS-22 grade as the Commandant of the National Police Academy. Khawaja is batchmates with prominent bureaucrats namely Fawad Hasan Fawad (PAS), Rizwan Ahmed (PAS),  Sikandar Sultan Raja (PAS) and Hussain Asghar (PSP).

Khawaja had taken some serious decisions and implemented the National Action Plan of Pakistan and Karachi operation during his tenure as Inspector General of Sindh Police from March 2016 to June 2018. In February 2020, Khawaja earned the rare honour for a police officer to head a federal ministry when he was posted as Federal Secretary for Narcotics Control, an office he held for 7 months.

Early life and family
Khawaja belongs to a village in Tando Muhammad Khan district. He was enrolled in Cadet College Petaro, from where he completed his Intermediate in 1982. After that, Khawaja completed his Master’s in Criminology from University of Sindh.

Career
Khawaja has served as SSP in various districts of Sindh and worked in Karachi as DIG in districts South and East. He also rendered his services in Intelligence Bureau (IB) as a joint director.

He was also posted as DIG for telecommunication and director for Sindh’s anti-corruption department. Khawaja also worked as personal staff officer for two chief ministers, Syed Muzaffar Hussain Shah and Syed Abdullah Ali Shah.

Khawaja was appointed to the position of IGP Sindh in March 2016 and served as the provincial top cop till June 2018. In September 2018, Prime Minister Imran Khan appointed Khawaja as the Inspector General of the National Highways & Motorway Police where he served till February 2020.

In February 2020, Khawaja earned the rare honour for a police officer to head a federal ministry when he was posted as Federal Secretary for Narcotics Control, an office he held for a period of 7 months. 

Khawaja is currently serving as Commandant of the National Police Academy in Islamabad.

See also
Central Superior Services

References

Sindhi people
Inspector Generals of Sindh Police
Year of birth missing (living people)
Living people
Place of birth missing (living people)
University of Sindh alumni
Cadet College Petaro alumni